Odrowąż  is a village in the administrative district of Gmina Czarny Dunajec, within Nowy Targ County, Lesser Poland Voivodeship, in southern Poland, close to the border with Slovakia.

In the summer of 1940, the German SS stormed the village and evicted the majority of the people in the village. BBC documentary: The Nazis, A Warning from History

The village has a population of 920.

References

Villages in Nowy Targ County